Big Guns is a 1987 pinball machine designed by Mark Ritchie and Python Anghelo and released by Williams.

Description
The player has to rescue a queen from King Tyrant and his warlords.  The game takes place in outer space, although it has a mix of medieval fantasy elements involved, such as trolls.  A description on the machine reads:

"Here, in the deepest of space, inside this fortress, our noble Queen is held captive, kidnapped by King Tyrant and his warlords.

"So, once again, in the eternal struggle of good against evil, we, the brave and the free, must launch the greatest invasion in the known history of the universe, to fight and crush our enemies, for the future of our federation - and our fair lady's honor - rides on these big guns."

External links
The Internet Pinball Database

Williams pinball machines
1987 pinball machines